Mark Jarzombek (born 1954) is a United States-born architectural historian, author and critic. Since 1995 he has taught and served within the History Theory Criticism Section of the Department of Architecture at MIT School of Architecture and Planning, Cambridge, Massachusetts, United States.

Career 
Jarzombek received his architectural training at the ETH Zurich, where he graduated in 1980. From there he went to MIT, where he received his doctorate in 1986. He taught at Cornell University until 1994. He has written on a wide variety of subjects, from Renaissance architecture to contemporary criticism. He was a 2005 Fellow at the Sterling and Francine Clark Art Institute (Williamstown, MA), a 2002 Fellow at the Canadian Centre for Architecture  (Montreal) a 1993 Resident Fellow at the Institute for Advanced Study  (Princeton) and a 1986  Post-doctoral Fellow at the Getty Center for the History of Art and the Humanities (Santa Monica).

Jarzombek taught a massive open online course "A Global History of Architecture" at edX in 2016.

Books 
 On Leon Battista Alberti, His Literary and Aesthetic Theories (MIT Press, 1989)
 The Psychologizing of Modernity: Art, Architecture and History (Cambridge University Press, 2000).
 Designing MIT: Bosworth's New Tech (Boston: Northeastern University Press, October 2004).
 A Global History of Architecture, with Vikram Prakash and Francis D. K. Ching (New York: Wiley & Sons, August 2006)
 "The Post-traumatic Turn and the Art of Walid Raad and Krzysztof Wodiczko: from Theory to Trope and Beyond," in Trauma and Visuality, Lisa Saltzman and Eric Rosenberg, editors (University Press of New England, 2006)
 Architecture of First Societies: A Global Perspective (New York: Wiley & Sons, 2014)
Digital Stockholm Syndrome in the Post-Ontological Age (Minneapolis: Univ Of Minnesota Press, 2016)

References

External links
Homepage
MIT faculty Profile
Global Architectural History Teaching Collaborative

American architectural historians
American architecture writers
American male non-fiction writers
Historiographers
Massachusetts Institute of Technology alumni
MIT School of Architecture and Planning faculty
Architectural theoreticians
Institute for Advanced Study visiting scholars
Cornell University faculty
Living people
1954 births
American art historians